Andrei Viktorovich Lozhkin (born 11 July 1984) is a Russian former professional footballer.

Club career
He made his professional debut in the Russian Second Division in 2000 for FC Dynamo Izhevsk. He made his Russian Football National League debut for FC Gazovik-Gazprom Izhevsk on 19 June 2001 in a game against FC Volgar-Gazprom Astrakhan.

References

1984 births
Living people
Russian footballers
Russia under-21 international footballers
FC KAMAZ Naberezhnye Chelny players
FC Ural Yekaterinburg players
FC Chernomorets Novorossiysk players
Association football defenders
FC Izhevsk players
FC Zenit-Izhevsk players
Sportspeople from Izhevsk